Martina Navratilova was the defending champion and won in the final 6–1, 7–5 against Andrea Jaeger.

Seeds
A champion seed is indicated in bold text while text in italics indicates the round in which that seed was eliminated. All eight seeds received a bye to the second round.

  Martina Navratilova (champion)
  Andrea Jaeger (final)
  Wendy Turnbull (semifinals)
  Hana Mandlíková (semifinals)
  Billie Jean King (quarterfinals)
  Virginia Ruzici (quarterfinals)
  Barbara Potter (quarterfinals)
  Yvonne Vermaak (quarterfinals)

Draw

Final

Section 1

Section 2

References
 1983 United Airlines Tournament of Champions Draw

Singles